Samed Onur (born 15 July 2002) is a professional footballer who plays as a winger for Fatih Karagümrük. Born in Germany, Onur is a youth international for Turkey.

Professional career
Onur joined the youth academy of Bayer Leverkusen in 2012 at the age of 10. Onur made his professional debut with Bayer Leverkusen in a 4-0 UEFA Europa League win against SK Slavia Prague on 10 December 2020.

On 12 July 2021, Onur signed with Süper Lig club Fatih Karagümrük on a free transfer.

References

External links
 
 
 DFB Profile

2002 births
German people of Turkish descent
Living people
Footballers from Düsseldorf
Turkish footballers
Turkey youth international footballers
Association football wingers
German footballers
Bayer 04 Leverkusen players
Fatih Karagümrük S.K. footballers
Süper Lig players